Amitié is a private transatlantic communications cable that connects the United States (Lynn), with the UK (Bude) and France (Le Porge). It was announced in 2020 and was due to go live in 2022.

History
Edge Cable Holdings (Facebook), AquaComms, Cable & Wireless Americas Systems (Vodafone) and Microsoft Infrastructure applied for a licence to land and operate a 6,800 kilometre optical submarine cable from the US in August 2020. The application stated the proposed private cable - Amitié - would be operated on a non-common-carrier basis. 

The proposed route for the new cable was from a landing site in Lynn, MA, US to a new landing station in the Bordeaux region of France (Le Porge) and the Bude landing station in the UK

In January 2021, Orange announced it had become part of this consortium and would act as the landing party for the Le Porge site. The partnership deal gives Orange ownership of the portion of the Amitié cable system that stretches from 12 nautical miles off the French shore to the French landing site. It also has two fibre pairs on the system on an IRU basis.  

Facebook's subsidiary - Edge USA - owns 80% of the cable and is the landing party for the US landing site at Lynn, contracting with the site's owner GTT. Vodafone is the landing party for the UK landing site at Bude through its subsidiary Apollo Submarine Cable System.

In September 2021, Orange announced it had landed the cable in Le Porge.

Specifications
The Amitié cable will have 16 fibre pairs each with 23Tbit/s capacity. The new cable is expected to support the development of the Bordeaux area in France into a new international digital hub, encouraging more data centres to be built. In 2021, Equinix unveiled a new carrier neutral data centre, BX1, in Bordeaux which will serve as the connectivity hub for the new cable.

Amitié was laid by Alcatel Submarine Networks (ASN) (a subsidiary of Nokia) at an estimated cost of 250 million euros. It is due to go live in 2022.

See also 
 Dark fibre
 Submarine communications cable
 Transatlantic communications cable

References 

Transatlantic communications cables